The following is a list of Ministers of the Interior of Turkey.

See also
Ministry of the Interior (Turkey)

References

External links
Turkish ministries, etc – Rulers.org

Ministers of the Interior
Interior
Ministry of the Interior (Turkey)